Judo competitions at the 2021 Junior Pan American Games in Cali, Colombia were scheduled to be held from November 26–28, 2021.

Medal summary

Medal table

Medalists

Men's

Women's

Mixed

References

External links
 

Judo
Pan American Games